Hilary Octavia Dawn Critchley FRSE FRSB FMedSci FFSRH FRCOG FRANZCOG is  Professor of Reproductive Medicine and an Honorary Consultant in Obstetrics and Gynaecology at the University of Edinburgh.

Education
 1991: Doctor of Medicine, University of Manchester
 1981: Bachelor of Medicine and Bachelor of Surgery, University of Manchester 
 1978: Bachelor of Science (2:1), University of Manchester

Career and research
She was appointed as the Head of School of Clinical Sciences in August 2012. She has published over 240 peer-reviewed articles in scientific journals and has appeared at international conferences.

Critchley's research focusses on local uterine mechanisms involved in menstruation and implantation, and addresses the mechanisms common to those reproductive processesinjury and repair, endocrineimmune interactions and regulation of inflammatory mediators. A particular area of interest has been the local endometrial response to withdrawal of progesterone, both physiological and pharmacological.

Her academic and professional qualifications include:
 2012: Fellow of the Royal Society of Edinburgh
 2010: Fellow of the Royal Society of Biology
 2009: Fellow of the Academy of Medical Sciences
 2005: Fellow of the Faculty of Sexual and Reproductive Healthcare
 1998: Fellow of the Royal College of Obstetricians and Gynaecologists 
 1991: Fellow of the Royal Australian and New Zealand College of Obstetricians and Gynaecologists

References

Year of birth missing (living people)
Living people
Alumni of the University of Manchester
Academics of the University of Edinburgh
Fellows of the Royal Society of Edinburgh
Fellows of the Royal Society of Biology
Fellows of the Academy of Medical Sciences (United Kingdom)
Fellows of the Royal College of Obstetricians and Gynaecologists
Scottish gynaecologists
Scottish obstetricians
Scottish women medical doctors
Women gynaecologists
Women's health in the United Kingdom